Édouard Chatton (11 October 1883 – 23 April 1947) was a French biologist who first characterized the distinction between the prokaryotic and eukaryotic cellular types. Chatton coined the terms and published them first in his 1937 paper 
"Pansporella perplex: Reflections on the Biology and Phylogeny of the Protozoa."

Chatton was born in Romont, Switzerland. His initial interest was in various human pathogenic protozoa, members of the Apicomplexa and Trypanosomatids. He later expanded his studies to include marine protists, helping to contribute to the description of the dinoflagellate protists. At the Pasteur Institute he met and became a mentor to André Michel Lwoff, future Nobel Laureate in Physiology or Medicine. The two scientists remained associates until Chatton's death in 1947, in Banyuls-sur-Mer, France.

References

External links
 A timeline of Chatton's life on Pasteur.fr

20th-century French zoologists
Evolutionary biologists
1883 births
1947 deaths